O'Neill McKay Donaldson (born 24 November 1969) is an English former professional footballer who played as a  striker.

He notably played in the Premier League for Sheffield Wednesday, as well as in the Football League with Shrewsbury Town, Doncaster Rovers, Mansfield Town, Oxford United, Stoke City and Torquay United. He also started and finished his playing career in non-league with Hinckley United and Halesowen Town respectively.

Career
Donaldson began his career at non-league Hinckley United where his form attracted the attention of English Football League scouts, leading to him ultimately signing for Shrewsbury Town in November 1991. Donaldson did not gain a regular first team spot at the club, most often appearing as a substitute and was given a free transfer to Doncaster Rovers in 1994. Although he did not gain a regular first team place at Rovers either, Donaldson's reputation grew from a brief but goal-heavy spell on loan at Mansfield Town and it was his form at that club which convinced Sheffield Wednesday to sign him for £50,000.

Donaldson made his debut for the Owls as a sub against Manchester City on 18 March 1995. However, he quickly faded from the first team picture at a time when Wednesday boasted the likes of Mark Bright and David Hirst up front and Donaldson was forced to settle for a reserve role at the Hillsborough club. He largely impressed during a loan spell at Oxford United, although then manager Malcolm Shotton blamed the player's agent for blocking a deal that would have brought Donaldson to the Manor Ground on a permanent basis. Indeed, such was the desire to see Donaldson remain at the club full-time that a local fanzine editor even wrote to the player in an attempt to convince him to reconsider.

Ultimately Donaldson was released by Wednesday in March 1998 for a frustrating two-month spell at Stoke City, before he spent a further three years at Torquay United where injury and a lack of form once again denied him a regular first team place. He left the league in 2001 for a brief spell at Halesowen Town in the Western Division of the Southern Football League before retiring from football.

Career statistics
Source:

References

External links
 

1969 births
Doncaster Rovers F.C. players
English footballers
Association football forwards
Halesowen Town F.C. players
Hinckley United F.C. players
Living people
Mansfield Town F.C. players
Oxford United F.C. players
Premier League players
Sheffield Wednesday F.C. players
Shrewsbury Town F.C. players
Footballers from Birmingham, West Midlands
Stoke City F.C. players
Torquay United F.C. players
English Football League players